Callerebia is a butterfly genus of the family Nymphalidae endemic to the Himalayas.

Species
Callerebia annada (Moore, 1858)
Callerebia baileyi South, 1913
Callerebia caeca Watkins, 1925
Callerebia daksha Moore, 1874
Callerebia dibangensis Roy, 2013
Callerebia hybrida Butler, 1880
Callerebia kalinda (Moore, 1865)
Callerebia nirmala (Moore, 1865)
Callerebia orixa Moore, 1872
Callerebia polyphemus Oberthür, 1877
Callerebia scanda (Kollar, 1844)
Callerebia shallada (Lang, 1880)
Callerebia suroia Tytler, 1914
Callerebia tsirava Evans, 1915
Callerebia ulfi Huang, 2003
Callerebia watsoni Watkins, 1925

References
"Callerebia Butler, 1867" at Markku Savela's Lepidoptera and Some Other Life Forms

External links
Images representing Callerebia at Consortium for the Barcode of Life
Images representing Callerebia at Encyclopedia of Life 

Satyrini
Butterfly genera
Taxa named by Arthur Gardiner Butler